The Western Baltic culture (also known as  (West Baltic circle)) was the westernmost branch of the Balts, representing a distinct archaeological culture of the Bronze Age and Iron Age, along the southern coast of the Baltic Sea. It is a zone of several small archaeological cultures that were ethnically Baltic and had similar cultural features (e.g. similar monuments or some features of the funeral rite). They included tribes such as the Old Prussians, Galindians, Yotvingians (or Sudovians) and Skalvians, in addition to the little-known Pomeranian Balts or Western Balts proper, in the area now known as Pomerania.

History 
Most of the Western Balts arose from the  dating back to the early Iron Age. The Western Baltic culture includes: 

A.D., possibly even the end of the 5th c.)
  (from the mid-2nd c. A.D. to the end of the 6th c.)
  (from the end of the 1st c. A.D. to the beginning of the 6th c.)    
  (from the end of the 5th c. A.D. to the mid-7th c. or the beginning of the 8th c.)
 Elbląg group (from the end of the 5th c. A.D. to the mid-7th c.)    
 Low German group    
 West Lithuanian group    
 Central Lithuanian group

Geography, chronology and ancient mentions 
According to Marija Gimbutas, the Baltic culture of the Early and Middle Bronze Age covered a territory which, at its maximal extent, included "all of Pomerania almost to the mouth of the Oder, and the whole Vistula basin to Silesia in the south-west" before the spread of the Lusatian culture to the region and was inhabited by the ancestors of the later (Baltic) Old Prussians.

The Western Baltic cultures were located to the north-east of the Wielbark and Przeworsk cultures, between the Pasłęka and Daugava rivers. They lived there from the end of  until the mid-7th century. According to Tacitus, these areas were inhabited by the Aesti, while Ptolemy speaks of the Galindians and the Sudines.

Art and structures  
The Balts decorated their pots by creating "deep incisions and ridges around the neck." Baltic graves consisted of huts made out of timber, or stone cists with floors of pavement "encircled by timber posts".

See also
 Early history of Pomerania
 Dniepr Balts

References

Sources

See also 

 
 

Baltic archaeological cultures
Ancient peoples
Pomerania
Prehistoric Poland
Prehistory of Prussia